Juan Alfonso Valle (born 1905, death in November 28, 1982) was a Peruvian football midfielder who played for Peru in the 1930 FIFA World Cup. He also played for Circolo Sportivo Italiano.

References

External links
FIFA profile

1905 births
Year of death missing
Peruvian footballers
Peru international footballers
Association football midfielders
1930 FIFA World Cup players
Circolo Sportivo Italiano footballers